Grella is an Italian surname. Notable people with the surname include:

Mike Grella (born 1987), American soccer player
Vince Grella (born 1979), Australian footballer

See also
Grelle

Italian-language surnames
Surnames of Italian origin